December is the sixteenth and final studio album by the Moody Blues. The Christmas themed album released in 2003 is their first studio album since The Magnificent Moodies in 1965 to feature covers in addition to original material (in the time between the band only released one cover on record, "This Is the Moment" on the 1994 Time Traveller box set). It is also their only album to be recorded and released following the departure of Ray Thomas.

Track listing
"Don't Need a Reindeer" (Justin Hayward) – 3:59
"December Snow" (Hayward) – 5:11
"In the Quiet of Christmas Morning (Bach 147)" (Bach, Hayward, John Lodge) – 2:51
"On This Christmas Day" (Lodge) – 3:40
"Happy Xmas (War Is Over)" (John Lennon, Yoko Ono) – 2:37
"A Winter's Tale" (Mike Batt, Tim Rice) – 4:28
"The Spirit of Christmas" (Lodge) – 4:52
"Yes I Believe" (Hayward) – 4:21
"When a Child Is Born" (Zacar, Fred Jay) – 3:34
"White Christmas" (Irving Berlin) – 3:08
"In the Bleak Midwinter" (Holst, Rossetti) – 3:21

Personnel
 Justin Hayward – vocals, guitar
 John Lodge – vocals, bass guitar
 Graeme Edge – drums, percussion

Additional personnel
 Danilo Madonia – keyboards, sequencing, orchestration
 Norda Mullen – flute

Charts

References

The Moody Blues albums
2003 Christmas albums
Christmas albums by English artists
Rock Christmas albums
Universal Records albums
Musical settings of poems by Christina Rossetti